Natalio Wenceslao Portillo Herrera (born October 15, 1979 in Las Palmas (Chaco), Argentina) is an Argentine footballer currently playing for Atlético Minero of the Peruvian Segunda División.

Teams
  Ferro Carril Oeste 2000-2001
  Cortuluá 2001
  Ferro Carril Oeste 2001-2002
  Defensores de Cambaceres 2002-2004
  Estudiantes de Medicina 2004
  Sport Ancash 2005-2007
  Cienciano 2007-2008
  Atlético Minero 2008
  Colegio Nacional Iquitos 2009
  Sport Ancash 2010-2011
  José Gálvez 2012–2013
  Deportivo Municipal 2013–2014
  Atlético Minero 2014–

Titles
  Ferro Carril Oeste 2001-2002 (Primera B Metropolitana Championship)

References
 
 

1979 births
People from Las Palmas, Chaco
Living people
Argentine footballers
Argentine expatriate footballers
Primera B Metropolitana players
Ferro Carril Oeste footballers
Cortuluá footballers
Cienciano footballers
Atlético Minero footballers
Sport Áncash footballers
Defensores de Cambaceres footballers
Estudiantes de Medicina footballers
Colegio Nacional Iquitos footballers
Expatriate footballers in Peru
Expatriate footballers in Colombia
Association football forwards
Sportspeople from Chaco Province